Marcel Parcival Arthur van Dam (born 30 January 1938) is a retired Dutch politician of the Labour Party (PvdA) and journalist.

Van Dam worked as a researcher for the Wiardi Beckman Foundation from April 1967 until September 1969. Van Dam also was active as a political activist and was one of the leaders of the New Left movement in the Netherlands which aimed to steer the Labour Party more to the Left. Van Dam worked as a journalist for the VARA from September 1969 until May 1973 as an ombudsman from September 1969 until May 1973 and as an editor from April 1971 until May 1973. After the election of 1972 Van Dam was appointed as State Secretary for Housing and Spatial Planning in the Cabinet Den Uyl, taking office on 11 May 1973. The Cabinet Den Uyl fell on 22 March 1977 and continued to serve in a demissionary capacity. Van Dam was elected as a Member of the House of Representatives after the election of 1977, taking office on 8 June 1977 but he was still serving in the cabinet and because of dualism customs in the constitutional convention of Dutch politics he couldn't serve a dual mandate he subsequently resigned as State Secretary on 8 September 1977. After the election of 1981 Van Dam was appointed as Minister of Housing and Spatial Planning in the Cabinet Van Agt II, taking office on 11 September 1981. The Cabinet Van Agt II fell just seven months into its term on 12 May 1982 and continued to serve in a demissionary capacity until it was replaced by the caretaker Cabinet Van Agt III on 29 May 1982. After the election of 1982 Van Dam returned as a Member of the House of Representatives, taking office on 16 September 1982.

In December 1985 Van Dam was nominated as Chairman of the Board of directors of public broadcaster VARA, he resigned as a Member of the House of Representatives on 22 January 1986 and was installed as a Chairman serving from 10 January 1986 until 30 November 1995. Van Dam remained active in the public sector for the VARA working as a television presenter and television producer for several political programs from January 1996 until January 2005 and occupied numerous seats as a nonprofit director on several boards of directors and supervisory boards (International Institute of Social History, Terre des hommes, International Fellowship of Reconciliation and the Institute for Multiparty Democracy) and as an advocate and activist for social justice, social integration, anti-war movement, multiculturalism, minority groups and housing reformer.

Van Dam is known for his abilities as a debater and negotiator. Following his retirement Van Dam remains active as a political pundit and columnist for the VARA and the de Volkskrant and continues to comment on political affairs.

Early life 
Van Dam was born into a Catholic family as one of nine siblings, however during his childhood, both his youngest brother and one of his elder brothers died. During the Second World War, Van Dam's family had to go into hiding, as a result of his father's refusal to arrest Jews, and his subsequent contribution to the resistance.

In 1956 Van Dam became a member of the KVP and from 1957 he studied law and sociology at Utrecht University. He never completed studies in law, graduating instead as a sociologist. In 1965 he graduated with thesis on voter behaviour, before performing the first exit poll held in the Netherlands during parliamentary elections as per the methodology he had earlier developed.

Labor Party 
During the first Van Agt cabinet (1977-1981), Van Dam became the state secretary of Housing for the PvdA before the fall of the cabinet, then later becoming member of the House of Representatives (1977–1981).

At the height of the Lockheed Affair in 1976, Van Dam came into conflict with then-Prime Minister Joop den Uyl. The Prime Minister pushed for a compromise on the sensitive issue, advocating that the prince consort Bernhard van Lippe-Biesterfeld should escape legal prosecution. Van Dam, however, thought the prince would be unjustly released. As he recounts: "I called Joop and said, Joop, I am resigning. And I went home." He later rescinded his resignation.

Decorations

References

External links

Official
  Drs. M.P.A. (Marcel) van Dam Parlement & Politiek

 
 

1938 births
Living people
Dutch anti-racism activists
Commanders of the Order of Orange-Nassau
Dutch anti–nuclear weapons activists
Dutch anti-war activists
Dutch atheists
Dutch columnists
Dutch former Christians
Dutch magazine editors
Dutch nonprofit directors
Dutch opinion journalists
Dutch people of World War II
Dutch political commentators
Dutch political journalists
Dutch public broadcasting administrators
Dutch republicans
Dutch social justice activists
Dutch sociologists
Dutch television editors
Dutch television presenters
Dutch television producers
Former Roman Catholics
Housing reformers
Knights of the Order of the Netherlands Lion
Labour Party (Netherlands) politicians
Members of the House of Representatives (Netherlands)
Ministers of Housing and Spatial Planning of the Netherlands
Minority rights activists
Ombudsmen
People from Nunspeet
Politicians from Utrecht (city)
Political sociologists
State Secretaries for Housing and Spatial Planning of the Netherlands
Utrecht University alumni
Writers about activism and social change
20th-century Dutch journalists
20th-century Dutch male writers
20th-century Dutch politicians
21st-century Dutch journalists
21st-century Dutch male writers